1461 Jean-Jacques, provisional designation , is a metallic asteroid from the outer region of the asteroid belt, approximately 34 kilometers in diameter. It was discovered on 30 December 1937, by French astronomer Marguerite Laugier at Nice Observatory in southern France, who named it after her son Jean-Jacques Laugier.

Orbit and classification 

Jean-Jacques orbits the Sun in the outer main-belt at a distance of 3.0–3.3 AU once every 5 years and 6 months (2,018 days). Its orbit has an eccentricity of 0.05 and an inclination of 15° with respect to the ecliptic.

Physical characteristics 

In the Tholen classification, Jean-Jacques is a metallic M-type asteroid.

Rotation period 

In March 2005, a rotational lightcurve of Jean-Jacques was obtained from photometric observations by Laurent Bernasconi and Horacio Correia. Lightcurve analysis gave a rotation period of 16.56 hours with a brightness variation of 0.09 in magnitude.

Diameter and albedo 

According to the surveys carried out by the Infrared Astronomical Satellite IRAS, the Japanese Akari satellite, and NASA's Wide-field Infrared Survey Explorer with its subsequent NEOWISE mission, Jean-Jacques measures between 25.33 and 41.43 kilometers in diameter and its surface has an albedo between 0.102 and 0.273.

The Collaborative Asteroid Lightcurve Link adopts the results from IRAS, that is an albedo of 0.161 and a diameter of 32.94 kilometers with an absolute magnitude of 10.01.

Naming 

This minor planet was named after Jean-Jacques Laugier, the son of the discoverer. The official  was published by the Minor Planet Center on 31 January 1962.

References

External links 
 Asteroid Lightcurve Database (LCDB), query form (info )
 Dictionary of Minor Planet Names, Google books
 Asteroids and comets rotation curves, CdR – Observatoire de Genève, Raoul Behrend
 Discovery Circumstances: Numbered Minor Planets (1)-(5000) – Minor Planet Center
 
 

001461
Discoveries by Marguerite Laugier
Named minor planets
001461
19371230